Vuelta Ciclista a Burgos is an elite professional road bicycle racing event held annually in the Burgos province of Spain. The men's Vuelta a Burgos has been a multi-day stage race as part of the UCI Europe Tour since 2005. In 2019, a multi-day women's stage race, the Vuelta a Burgos Feminas, was added that runs in mid-May. The men's race became part of the new UCI ProSeries in 2020.

Winners men's race

Winners women's race

References

External links
 

 
UCI Europe Tour races
Burgos
Recurring sporting events established in 1946
1946 establishments in Spain
Bur